Marginea River may refer to:

 Marginea, a tributary of the Ciban in Sibiu County
 Marginea, a tributary of the Topolog in Vâlcea County

See also 
 Marginea Domnească River
 Marginea